Dactyloceras neumayeri is a moth in the  family Brahmaeidae. It was described by Pagenstecher in 1885. It is found in Kenya and Tanzania.

References

Natural History Museum Lepidoptera generic names catalog

Brahmaeidae
Moths described in 1885